The 1927 VFL season was the 31st season of the Victorian Football League (VFL), the highest level senior Australian rules football competition in Victoria. The season featured twelve clubs, ran from 30 April until 1 October, and comprised an 18-game home-and-away season followed by a finals series featuring the top four clubs.

The premiership was won by the Collingwood Football Club for the sixth time, after it defeated  by 12 points in the 1927 VFL Grand Final.

Premiership season
In 1927, the VFL competition consisted of twelve teams of 18 on-the-field players each, with no "reserves", although any of the 18 players who had left the playing field for any reason could later resume their place on the field at any time during the match.

Teams played each other in a home-and-away season of 18 rounds; matches 12 to 17 were the "home-and-away reverse" of matches 1 to 6, and match 18 the "home-and-away reverse" of match 11.

Once the 18 round home-and-away season had finished, the 1927 VFL Premiers were determined by the specific format and conventions of the amended "Argus system".

Round 1

|- bgcolor="#CCCCFF"
| Home team
| Home team score
| Away team
| Away team score
| Venue
| Crowd
| Date
|- bgcolor="#FFFFFF"
| 
| 16.19 (115)
| 
| 9.11 (65)
| MCG
| 22,382
| 30 April 1927
|- bgcolor="#FFFFFF"
| 
| 16.11 (107)
| 
| 12.12 (84)
| Victoria Park
| 20,000
| 30 April 1927
|- bgcolor="#FFFFFF"
| 
| 9.15 (69)
| 
| 10.10 (70)
| Princes Park
| 28,000
| 30 April 1927
|- bgcolor="#FFFFFF"
| 
| 12.16 (88)
| 
| 11.2 (68)
| Junction Oval
| 12,000
| 30 April 1927
|- bgcolor="#FFFFFF"
| 
| 9.21 (75)
| 
| 10.11 (71)
| Arden Street Oval
| 10,000
| 30 April 1927
|- bgcolor="#FFFFFF"
| 
| 10.3 (63)
| 
| 16.14 (110)
| Western Oval
| 18,000
| 30 April 1927

Round 2

|- bgcolor="#CCCCFF"
| Home team
| Home team score
| Away team
| Away team score
| Venue
| Crowd
| Date
|- bgcolor="#FFFFFF"
| 
| 8.11 (59)
| 
| 6.12 (48)
| Punt Road Oval
| 18,000
| 7 May 1927
|- bgcolor="#FFFFFF"
| 
| 8.6 (54)
| 
| 10.5 (65)
| Windy Hill
| 20,000
| 7 May 1927
|- bgcolor="#FFFFFF"
| 
| 12.11 (83)
| 
| 7.11 (53)
| Lake Oval
| 25,000
| 7 May 1927
|- bgcolor="#FFFFFF"
| 
| 14.20 (104)
| 
| 8.12 (60)
| Corio Oval
| 15,300
| 7 May 1927
|- bgcolor="#FFFFFF"
| 
| 7.9 (51)
| 
| 11.11 (77)
| Glenferrie Oval
| 9,000
| 7 May 1927
|- bgcolor="#FFFFFF"
| 
| 11.6 (72)
| 
| 14.15 (99)
| Brunswick Street Oval
| 25,000
| 7 May 1927

Round 3

|- bgcolor="#CCCCFF"
| Home team
| Home team score
| Away team
| Away team score
| Venue
| Crowd
| Date
|- bgcolor="#FFFFFF"
| 
| 8.15 (63)
| 
| 7.13 (55)
| Junction Oval
| 22,000
| 14 May 1927
|- bgcolor="#FFFFFF"
| 
| 10.18 (78)
| 
| 7.10 (52)
| Western Oval
| 11,000
| 14 May 1927
|- bgcolor="#FFFFFF"
| 
| 6.13 (49)
| 
| 7.13 (55)
| Victoria Park
| 20,000
| 14 May 1927
|- bgcolor="#FFFFFF"
| 
| 7.5 (47)
| 
| 4.12 (36)
| Princes Park
| 27,000
| 14 May 1927
|- bgcolor="#FFFFFF"
| 
| 8.5 (53)
| 
| 7.13 (55)
| Arden Street Oval
| 20,000
| 14 May 1927
|- bgcolor="#FFFFFF"
| 
| 13.15 (93)
| 
| 8.11 (59)
| MCG
| 14,931
| 14 May 1927

Round 4

|- bgcolor="#CCCCFF"
| Home team
| Home team score
| Away team
| Away team score
| Venue
| Crowd
| Date
|- bgcolor="#FFFFFF"
| 
| 8.8 (56)
| 
| 20.13 (133)
| Glenferrie Oval
| 8,000
| 21 May 1927
|- bgcolor="#FFFFFF"
| 
| 13.14 (92)
| 
| 11.9 (75)
| Brunswick Street Oval
| 16,000
| 21 May 1927
|- bgcolor="#FFFFFF"
| 
| 8.12 (60)
| 
| 11.12 (78)
| Windy Hill
| 20,000
| 21 May 1927
|- bgcolor="#FFFFFF"
| 
| 13.22 (100)
| 
| 3.12 (30)
| Punt Road Oval
| 14,000
| 21 May 1927
|- bgcolor="#FFFFFF"
| 
| 9.13 (67)
| 
| 16.10 (106)
| Lake Oval
| 29,000
| 21 May 1927
|- bgcolor="#FFFFFF"
| 
| 18.15 (123)
| 
| 11.11 (77)
| Corio Oval
| 16,000
| 21 May 1927

Round 5

|- bgcolor="#CCCCFF"
| Home team
| Home team score
| Away team
| Away team score
| Venue
| Crowd
| Date
|- bgcolor="#FFFFFF"
| 
| 5.8 (38)
| 
| 12.11 (83)
| Arden Street Oval
| 18,000
| 28 May 1927
|- bgcolor="#FFFFFF"
| 
| 7.13 (55)
| 
| 6.13 (49)
| Western Oval
| 10,000
| 28 May 1927
|- bgcolor="#FFFFFF"
| 
| 18.15 (123)
| 
| 9.5 (59)
| Victoria Park
| 16,000
| 28 May 1927
|- bgcolor="#FFFFFF"
| 
| 14.12 (96)
| 
| 6.16 (52)
| Princes Park
| 10,000
| 28 May 1927
|- bgcolor="#FFFFFF"
| 
| 7.16 (58)
| 
| 12.13 (85)
| MCG
| 18,320
| 28 May 1927
|- bgcolor="#FFFFFF"
| 
| 14.7 (91)
| 
| 12.10 (82)
| Junction Oval
| 16,000
| 28 May 1927

Round 6

|- bgcolor="#CCCCFF"
| Home team
| Home team score
| Away team
| Away team score
| Venue
| Crowd
| Date
|- bgcolor="#FFFFFF"
| 
| 12.8 (80)
| 
| 17.10 (112)
| Glenferrie Oval
| 10,000
| 4 June 1927
|- bgcolor="#FFFFFF"
| 
| 12.17 (89)
| 
| 11.4 (70)
| Corio Oval
| 14,500
| 4 June 1927
|- bgcolor="#FFFFFF"
| 
| 7.7 (49)
| 
| 7.14 (56)
| Windy Hill
| 25,000
| 4 June 1927
|- bgcolor="#FFFFFF"
| 
| 8.13 (61)
| 
| 13.13 (91)
| Brunswick Street Oval
| 15,000
| 6 June 1927
|- bgcolor="#FFFFFF"
| 
| 14.13 (97)
| 
| 9.9 (63)
| Lake Oval
| 25,000
| 6 June 1927
|- bgcolor="#FFFFFF"
| 
| 12.18 (90)
| 
| 17.8 (110)
| Punt Road Oval
| 42,000
| 6 June 1927

Round 7

|- bgcolor="#CCCCFF"
| Home team
| Home team score
| Away team
| Away team score
| Venue
| Crowd
| Date
|- bgcolor="#FFFFFF"
| 
| 15.21 (111)
| 
| 3.9 (27)
| MCG
| 12,075
| 11 June 1927
|- bgcolor="#FFFFFF"
| 
| 9.10 (64)
| 
| 11.11 (77)
| Windy Hill
| 16,000
| 11 June 1927
|- bgcolor="#FFFFFF"
| 
| 25.19 (169)
| 
| 7.15 (57)
| Victoria Park
| 16,000
| 11 June 1927
|- bgcolor="#FFFFFF"
| 
| 10.6 (66)
| 
| 6.12 (48)
| Princes Park
| 22,000
| 11 June 1927
|- bgcolor="#FFFFFF"
| 
| 10.11 (71)
| 
| 15.17 (107)
| Lake Oval
| 25,000
| 11 June 1927
|- bgcolor="#FFFFFF"
| 
| 11.11 (77)
| 
| 15.13 (103)
| Glenferrie Oval
| 7,000
| 11 June 1927

Round 8

|- bgcolor="#CCCCFF"
| Home team
| Home team score
| Away team
| Away team score
| Venue
| Crowd
| Date
|- bgcolor="#FFFFFF"
| 
| 22.23 (155)
| 
| 8.8 (56)
| Corio Oval
| 8,500
| 18 June 1927
|- bgcolor="#FFFFFF"
| 
| 14.11 (95)
| 
| 11.14 (80)
| Brunswick Street Oval
| 10,000
| 18 June 1927
|- bgcolor="#FFFFFF"
| 
| 8.7 (55)
| 
| 15.15 (105)
| Junction Oval
| 14,000
| 18 June 1927
|- bgcolor="#FFFFFF"
| 
| 15.12 (102)
| 
| 11.13 (79)
| Punt Road Oval
| 25,000
| 18 June 1927
|- bgcolor="#FFFFFF"
| 
| 4.12 (36)
| 
| 7.16 (58)
| Western Oval
| 17,000
| 18 June 1927
|- bgcolor="#FFFFFF"
| 
| 4.11 (35)
| 
| 9.15 (69)
| Arden Street Oval
| 15,000
| 18 June 1927

Round 9

|- bgcolor="#CCCCFF"
| Home team
| Home team score
| Away team
| Away team score
| Venue
| Crowd
| Date
|- bgcolor="#FFFFFF"
| 
| 9.6 (60)
| 
| 9.20 (74)
| Glenferrie Oval
| 10,000
| 25 June 1927
|- bgcolor="#FFFFFF"
| 
| 12.12 (84)
| 
| 15.9 (99)
| Windy Hill
| 17,000
| 25 June 1927
|- bgcolor="#FFFFFF"
| 
| 15.7 (97)
| 
| 13.10 (88)
| Junction Oval
| 13,000
| 25 June 1927
|- bgcolor="#FFFFFF"
| 
| 10.13 (73)
| 
| 7.9 (51)
| MCG
| 15,171
| 25 June 1927
|- bgcolor="#FFFFFF"
| 
| 12.15 (87)
| 
| 12.8 (80)
| Corio Oval
| 13,500
| 25 June 1927
|- bgcolor="#FFFFFF"
| 
| 13.5 (83)
| 
| 14.11 (95)
| Victoria Park
| 33,000
| 25 June 1927

Round 10

|- bgcolor="#CCCCFF"
| Home team
| Home team score
| Away team
| Away team score
| Venue
| Crowd
| Date
|- bgcolor="#FFFFFF"
| 
| 3.12 (30)
| 
| 5.13 (43)
| Western Oval
| 7,000
| 2 July 1927
|- bgcolor="#FFFFFF"
| 
| 6.12 (48)
| 
| 7.6 (48)
| Windy Hill
| 7,000
| 2 July 1927
|- bgcolor="#FFFFFF"
| 
| 8.11 (59)
| 
| 3.11 (29)
| Victoria Park
| 7,000
| 2 July 1927
|- bgcolor="#FFFFFF"
| 
| 8.7 (55)
| 
| 10.10 (70)
| Princes Park
| 13,000
| 2 July 1927
|- bgcolor="#FFFFFF"
| 
| 13.19 (97)
| 
| 5.11 (41)
| Lake Oval
| 5,000
| 2 July 1927
|- bgcolor="#FFFFFF"
| 
| 9.15 (69)
| 
| 7.11 (53)
| Punt Road Oval
| 15,000
| 2 July 1927

Round 11

|- bgcolor="#CCCCFF"
| Home team
| Home team score
| Away team
| Away team score
| Venue
| Crowd
| Date
|- bgcolor="#FFFFFF"
| 
| 10.12 (72)
| 
| 9.12 (66)
| Corio Oval
| 13,500
| 9 July 1927
|- bgcolor="#FFFFFF"
| 
| 8.7 (55)
| 
| 17.9 (111)
| Brunswick Street Oval
| 18,000
| 9 July 1927
|- bgcolor="#FFFFFF"
| 
| 9.18 (72)
| 
| 15.10 (100)
| Arden Street Oval
| 12,000
| 9 July 1927
|- bgcolor="#FFFFFF"
| 
| 9.17 (71)
| 
| 11.12 (78)
| Glenferrie Oval
| 6,000
| 9 July 1927
|- bgcolor="#FFFFFF"
| 
| 10.12 (72)
| 
| 11.13 (79)
| MCG
| 27,092
| 9 July 1927
|- bgcolor="#FFFFFF"
| 
| 6.8 (44)
| 
| 21.9 (135)
| Junction Oval
| 19,000
| 9 July 1927

Round 12

|- bgcolor="#CCCCFF"
| Home team
| Home team score
| Away team
| Away team score
| Venue
| Crowd
| Date
|- bgcolor="#FFFFFF"
| 
| 7.12 (54)
| 
| 8.11 (59)
| Glenferrie Oval
| 5,000
| 16 July 1927
|- bgcolor="#FFFFFF"
| 
| 14.5 (89)
| 
| 10.14 (74)
| Brunswick Street Oval
| 8,000
| 16 July 1927
|- bgcolor="#FFFFFF"
| 
| 12.19 (91)
| 
| 8.9 (57)
| Windy Hill
| 18,000
| 16 July 1927
|- bgcolor="#FFFFFF"
| 
| 10.15 (75)
| 
| 6.8 (44)
| Punt Road Oval
| 35,000
| 16 July 1927
|- bgcolor="#FFFFFF"
| 
| 7.7 (49)
| 
| 9.11 (65)
| Corio Oval
| 21,500
| 16 July 1927
|- bgcolor="#FFFFFF"
| 
| 12.8 (80)
| 
| 8.21 (69)
| Lake Oval
| 28,000
| 16 July 1927

Round 13

|- bgcolor="#CCCCFF"
| Home team
| Home team score
| Away team
| Away team score
| Venue
| Crowd
| Date
|- bgcolor="#FFFFFF"
| 
| 20.20 (140)
| 
| 11.5 (71)
| MCG
| 23,668
| 23 July 1927
|- bgcolor="#FFFFFF"
| 
| 9.6 (60)
| 
| 10.19 (79)
| Western Oval
| 12,500
| 23 July 1927
|- bgcolor="#FFFFFF"
| 
| 18.13 (121)
| 
| 6.11 (47)
| Victoria Park
| 7,000
| 23 July 1927
|- bgcolor="#FFFFFF"
| 
| 11.10 (76)
| 
| 9.16 (70)
| Princes Park
| 21,000
| 23 July 1927
|- bgcolor="#FFFFFF"
| 
| 9.17 (71)
| 
| 16.14 (110)
| Junction Oval
| 16,000
| 23 July 1927
|- bgcolor="#FFFFFF"
| 
| 7.8 (50)
| 
| 7.12 (54)
| Arden Street Oval
| 9,000
| 23 July 1927

Round 14

|- bgcolor="#CCCCFF"
| Home team
| Home team score
| Away team
| Away team score
| Venue
| Crowd
| Date
|- bgcolor="#FFFFFF"
| 
| 17.21 (123)
| 
| 3.11 (29)
| Corio Oval
| 11,000
| 30 July 1927
|- bgcolor="#FFFFFF"
| 
| 13.11 (89)
| 
| 11.11 (77)
| Brunswick Street Oval
| 15,500
| 30 July 1927
|- bgcolor="#FFFFFF"
| 
| 13.20 (98)
| 
| 8.9 (57)
| Lake Oval
| 14,000
| 30 July 1927
|- bgcolor="#FFFFFF"
| 
| 8.19 (67)
| 
| 11.19 (85)
| Glenferrie Oval
| 5,000
| 30 July 1927
|- bgcolor="#FFFFFF"
| 
| 9.7 (61)
| 
| 12.12 (84)
| Punt Road Oval
| 38,000
| 30 July 1927
|- bgcolor="#FFFFFF"
| 
| 8.15 (63)
| 
| 10.11 (71)
| Windy Hill
| 20,000
| 30 July 1927

Round 15

|- bgcolor="#CCCCFF"
| Home team
| Home team score
| Away team
| Away team score
| Venue
| Crowd
| Date
|- bgcolor="#FFFFFF"
| 
| 7.8 (50)
| 
| 11.15 (81)
| Western Oval
| 15,500
| 6 August 1927
|- bgcolor="#FFFFFF"
| 
| 18.14 (122)
| 
| 6.7 (43)
| Victoria Park
| 15,000
| 6 August 1927
|- bgcolor="#FFFFFF"
| 
| 10.6 (66)
| 
| 13.20 (98)
| Princes Park
| 30,000
| 6 August 1927
|- bgcolor="#FFFFFF"
| 
| 11.10 (76)
| 
| 15.9 (99)
| Arden Street Oval
| 4,000
| 6 August 1927
|- bgcolor="#FFFFFF"
| 
| 13.11 (89)
| 
| 11.16 (82)
| Junction Oval
| 10,000
| 6 August 1927
|- bgcolor="#FFFFFF"
| 
| 20.20 (140)
| 
| 8.2 (50)
| MCG
| 15,895
| 6 August 1927

Round 16

|- bgcolor="#CCCCFF"
| Home team
| Home team score
| Away team
| Away team score
| Venue
| Crowd
| Date
|- bgcolor="#FFFFFF"
| 
| 13.8 (86)
| 
| 9.7 (61)
| Corio Oval
| 17,200
| 27 August 1927
|- bgcolor="#FFFFFF"
| 
| 9.18 (72)
| 
| 7.6 (48)
| Windy Hill
| 9,000
| 27 August 1927
|- bgcolor="#FFFFFF"
| 
| 14.15 (99)
| 
| 9.8 (62)
| Punt Road Oval
| 10,000
| 27 August 1927
|- bgcolor="#FFFFFF"
| 
| 9.20 (74)
| 
| 10.10 (70)
| Lake Oval
| 9,000
| 27 August 1927
|- bgcolor="#FFFFFF"
| 
| 14.11 (95)
| 
| 13.10 (88)
| Brunswick Street Oval
| 25,000
| 27 August 1927
|- bgcolor="#FFFFFF"
| 
| 10.10 (70)
| 
| 14.14 (98)
| Glenferrie Oval
| 8,000
| 27 August 1927

Round 17

|- bgcolor="#CCCCFF"
| Home team
| Home team score
| Away team
| Away team score
| Venue
| Crowd
| Date
|- bgcolor="#FFFFFF"
| 
| 8.12 (60)
| 
| 11.12 (78)
| Arden Street Oval
| 5,000
| 3 September 1927
|- bgcolor="#FFFFFF"
| 
| 3.13 (31)
| 
| 4.6 (30)
| Victoria Park
| 8,000
| 3 September 1927
|- bgcolor="#FFFFFF"
| 
| 4.6 (30)
| 
| 3.5 (23)
| Princes Park
| 30,000
| 3 September 1927
|- bgcolor="#FFFFFF"
| 
| 10.13 (73)
| 
| 3.15 (33)
| MCG
| 5,268
| 3 September 1927
|- bgcolor="#FFFFFF"
| 
| 9.18 (72)
| 
| 8.22 (70)
| Junction Oval
| 8,000
| 3 September 1927
|- bgcolor="#FFFFFF"
| 
| 15.11 (101)
| 
| 9.18 (72)
| Western Oval
| 8,000
| 3 September 1927

Round 18

|- bgcolor="#CCCCFF"
| Home team
| Home team score
| Away team
| Away team score
| Venue
| Crowd
| Date
|- bgcolor="#FFFFFF"
| 
| 10.6 (66)
| 
| 10.13 (73)
| Western Oval
| 11,000
| 10 September 1927
|- bgcolor="#FFFFFF"
| 
| 15.16 (106)
| 
| 7.9 (51)
| Princes Park
| 24,000
| 10 September 1927
|- bgcolor="#FFFFFF"
| 
| 16.23 (119)
| 
| 6.17 (53)
| Punt Road Oval
| 11,000
| 10 September 1927
|- bgcolor="#FFFFFF"
| 
| 14.11 (95)
| 
| 15.15 (105)
| Lake Oval
| 15,000
| 10 September 1927
|- bgcolor="#FFFFFF"
| 
| 5.13 (43)
| 
| 14.10 (94)
| Brunswick Street Oval
| 11,000
| 10 September 1927
|- bgcolor="#FFFFFF"
| 
| 7.14 (56)
| 
| 11.16 (82)
| Arden Street Oval
| 11,000
| 10 September 1927

Ladder

Finals

All of the 1927 finals were played at the MCG so the home team in the semi-finals and Preliminary Final is purely the higher ranked team from the ladder but in the Grand Final the home team was the team that won the Preliminary Final.

Semi finals

|- bgcolor="#CCCCFF"
| Home team
| Score
| Away team
| Score
| Venue
| Crowd
| Date
|- bgcolor="#FFFFFF"
| 
| 12.10 (82)
| 
| 11.10 (76)
| MCG
| 63,620
| 17 September
|- bgcolor="#FFFFFF"
| Collingwood
| 16.18 (114)
| 
| 7.6 (48)
| MCG
| 40,595
| 24 September

Grand final

Collingwood defeated Richmond 2.13 (25) to 1.7 (13), in front of a crowd of 34,511 people. (For an explanation of scoring see Australian rules football).

Awards
 The 1927 VFL Premiership team was Collingwood.
 The VFL's leading goalkicker was Gordon Coventry of Collingwood with 97 goals.
 The winner of the 1927 Brownlow Medal was Syd Coventry of Collingwood with 7 votes.
 Hawthorn took the "wooden spoon" in 1927.
Carlton 12.22 (94) defeated  11.9 (75) in the challenge Grand Final, played as a stand-alone game on 8 October at the Melbourne Cricket Ground before a crowd of 4,210.

Notable events
 In round 9, remembered as "Duncan's Match", Carlton's centre-halfback Alex Duncan took at least 33 marks (some claim he took as many as 45) in a single match.
 South Melbourne Football Club introduced a popular innovation: selling reserved grandstand seats.
 After the round 10 match, the Secretary of the Richmond Football Club, Percy "Pip" Page of "Page–McIntyre system fame, had his jaw broken in a fight that erupted during a club dance.
 The Grand Final was played under atrocious weather conditions on a Melbourne Cricket Ground that resembled a swamp. The two teams scored a combined 38 points, and it was the lowest combined score of any VFL/AFL game (Grand Final or otherwise) played in the 20th century. Including the four seasons played in the 19th century (1897–1900), it was the equal 11th lowest-scoring game of all time.

References  

 Rogers, S. & Brown, A., Every Game Ever Played: VFL/AFL Results 1897–1997 (Sixth Edition), Viking Books (Ringwood), 1998. 
 Ross, J. (ed), 100 Years of Australian Football 1897–1996: The Complete Story of the AFL, All the Big Stories, All the Great Pictures, All the Champions, Every AFL Season Reported, Viking (Ringwood), 1996.

External links
 1927 Season – AFL Tables

Australian Football League seasons
VFL